The Jerudong Park Amphitheater is an amphitheater at Jerudong Park in Bandar Seri Begawan, Brunei. The amphitheater was built for a free Michael Jackson concert for the Sultan Hassanal Bolkiah's fiftieth birthday in 1996. The theater is located in Jerudong Park's Garden, designed with only a roof and its capacity is over 60,000. The stage is removable and can be replaced with an other stage. 

When Michael Jackson performed at the theater, he replaced the built-in stage with his own stage, from the Dangerous World Tour. When he returned for the HIStory World Tour, Jackson used the stage for the tour minus the cherry picker and a statue of Jackson. Whitney Houston and Janet Jackson, however, used the built-in stage. The theater is now used for wedding receptions, fundraiser events, and concerts.

Concerts

Michael Jackson
On July 16, 1996, American singer-songwriter and pop icon Michael Jackson performed a free, private concert for Sultan Hassanal Bolkiah's fiftieth birthday. The concert resembled one from his previous Dangerous World Tour. Jackson was reportedly paid $17M ($32 million in 2023 dollars). Jackson would return to the venue, later that year, on December 31, as part of the HIStory World Tour; the Sultan was in attendance.

Whitney Houston

On August 24, 1996, American singer-actress Whitney Houston performed a concert for Princess Rashidah's wedding. The concert resembled one from her previous The Bodyguard World Tour. Houston also performed "The Greatest Love of All" and "Exhale (Shoop Shoop)". The concert was attended by the Sultan, Princess Rashidah, and her husband 'Abdul Rahim. Houston was paid $7 million dollars by the Sultan's brother, Prince Jefri.

Janet Jackson
During her Velvet Rope Tour, American singer Janet Jackson performed a concert for Princess Hamidah's twenty-first birthday, on April 22, 1998. British-Canadian girl group All Saints was the opening act and CDs of the performance were given to everyone in attendance. "Rope Burn", "Black Cat", and "What About" were not performed, possibility due to censorship reasons, and "Happy Birthday" was sung to the princess.

References 

Amphitheaters
Buildings and structures in Bandar Seri Begawan
Event venues established in 1996